Pasha was an Ottoman higher rank, and an honorary title.

Pasha or Paşa may also refer to:

Places
 Pasha, Queensland, a locality in the Isaac Region of Australia
 Pasha (river), in Leningrad Oblast, Russia
 "Pasha enclaves", another name for the India–Bangladesh enclaves

Science
 Pasha, a name for the Herona marathus species of butterfly
 Pasha butterflies, a name for some of the Charaxes genus of butterflies
 Pasha (protein), an alias for the DGCR8 protein, used especially when it appears in non-human animals such as D. melanogaster and C. elegans

Other uses
 Pasha, a diminutive of Pavel, itself a Russian and Czech form of Paul.
 Pasha (film), a 1968 French film directed by Georges Lautner
 Pasha (Hinduism), a supernatural weapon depicted in Hindu iconography
 Pasha (surname), a list of individuals with the surname
 Pasha Group, an American shipping company 
 Pasha Hawaii, a company in the Pasha Group that specializes in trade between Hawaii and the continental United States 
 PASHA Holding, an Azerbaijani financial corporation
 Pasha Records, an American record label 
 Pakistan Software Houses Association for IT and ITeS (P@SHA), a Pakistani IT trade body that promotes and develops the software and services industry
 Pasha, a GWR Iron Duke Class steam locomotive
 Pasha, a virtual pinball table that first appeared in the video game Pinball FX 2
 Purple Pasha, a fictional female character in Wee Sing in Sillyville

See also

 Pascha (disambiguation)
 MV Drake, a Panamax bulk carrier ship formerly known as the MV Pasha Bulker that was renamed in 2008
 Paskha, a Slavic festive dish made in Eastern Orthodox countries that consists of food that is forbidden during the fast of Great Lent